Guillermo Bernabe Aguilera y Sanchez (8 April 1901 in Camagüey, Cuba - 25 September 1983) was a Cuban politician and businessman.

Aguilera was a Senator from Camagüey from 1954 until 1959. He was one of the largest rice growers in Cuba. He was the owner of Finca San Antonio (Plantation San Antonio) which was 1000 caballerias (33,200 acres) with 600 caballarias (19,920 acres) dedicated to growing rice. In 1953, he purchased 1700 cabillarias (56,440 acres) for $750,000. He was also the owner of a rice mill company "Molino de Arroz, S.A.".

Family
Aguilera was married to Elena Pollack Casuso (1911–1966), the daughter of Mark A. Pollack, a tobacco exporter. They had three children: Alina, Elena, and Guillermo Bernabe Aguillera-Pollack.
He was the brother-in-law of the Mercedes de la Torre y Alcoz, Marquesa de Arcos and grand-uncle of the South Florida radio personality, Henry Pollack.

References

 Jimenez Soler, Guillermo; Las Empresas de Cuba 1958; Editorial de Ciencias Sociales, Havana, Cuba (2008);  
 del Torre, Carlos; La Alta Burguesia Cubana, 1920–1958; Editorial de Ciencias Sociales, Havana, Cuba (2003);  

1901 births
20th-century Cuban businesspeople
Cuban senators
People from Camagüey
1983 deaths
Cuban landowners
20th-century landowners
Cuban emigrants to the United States